Pedro de Almeida (3 September 1939 – 22 September 2012) was a Portuguese athlete. He competed in the men's long jump at the 1960 Summer Olympics.

References

External links
 

1939 births
2012 deaths
Athletes (track and field) at the 1960 Summer Olympics
Portuguese male long jumpers
Olympic athletes of Portugal